Sazolie College, is a college in Jotsoma, Kohima District, Nagaland, India. The college was established in 2005. It offers undergraduate courses in arts and is affiliated to Nagaland University.

Departments

Arts
English
History
Political Science 
Sociology
Education
Psychology

Extra curricular activities 
In May 2022, Sazolie College organized the first ever intercollegiate Naga Wrestling competition in Nagaland at Indira Gandhi Stadium, Kohima. A total of 29 wrestlers from 13 colleges participated in the one day sporting event.

Accreditation
The college is recognized by the University Grants Commission (UGC).

References

External links
Sazolie College Official Website

Colleges affiliated to Nagaland University
Universities and colleges in Nagaland
Educational institutions established in 2005
2005 establishments in Nagaland